Stixis usambarica is a species of beetle in the family Cerambycidae. It was described by Adlbauer in 2010. It is known from Tanzania.

References

Phrissomini
Beetles of Africa
Insects of Tanzania
Endemic fauna of Tanzania
Beetles described in 2010